The 1996 United States presidential election in Idaho took place on November 5, 1996, as part of the 1996 United States presidential election. State voters chose four representatives, or electors to the Electoral College, who voted for president and vice president.

Idaho was won by Senator Bob Dole (R-KS) over President Bill Clinton (D), with Dole winning 52.18% to 33.65% for a margin of 18.53%. Billionaire businessman Ross Perot (Reform Party of the United States of America-TX) finished in third, with 12.71% of the popular vote. , this is the last election in which Nez Perce County and Shoshone County voted for a Democratic presidential candidate.

With 52.18% of the popular vote, Idaho proved to be Dole's fourth strongest state in the 1996 election after neighboring Utah, Kansas and Nebraska. The state also proved to be Ross Perot's third strongest state in the election after Maine and neighboring Montana. This also marked the first time since statehood that a Democrat was reelected president without carrying Idaho.

Results

Results by county

See also
 United States presidential elections in Idaho
 Presidency of Bill Clinton

References

External links
 Precinct Election Results from Idaho Secretary of State

Idaho
1996
1996 Idaho elections